Nurana Islands are a group of 2 artificial islands to the east of Northern City in the archipelago of Bahrain, which lie  west of the capital, Manama, on Bahrain Island.

Description
The proposed plan for the city was made in 2000, and they are part of the Northern City.
It is a residential area that is being reclaimed and constructed by the Ministry of Housing in Bahrain. 
North Nurana is designated for more upscale villas, while South Nurana is more medium class.
The islands were recently cleaned from debris.

Administration
The islands belongs to Northern Governorate .

Transportation
There is one causeways connecting South Nurana with Bahrain Island:
 Jid al Haj Bridge
A future causeway called the Gulf Drive will connect the Nurana islands to Muharraq Island through all reclaimed islands in the north.

Image gallery

References

Populated places in the Northern Governorate, Bahrain
Islands of Bahrain
Artificial islands of Bahrain
Islands of the Persian Gulf